Evelyn Pass is a mountain pass in Alberta, Canada.

Evelyn Pass has the name of Evelyn Cavendish, Duchess of Devonshire.

References

Mountain passes of Alberta